Arrowsmith is a surname. Notable people with the surname include:

 Aaron Arrowsmith (1750–1823), English cartographer
 Alf Arrowsmith (1942–2005), English footballer
 Anna Arrowsmith (born 1972), under the pseudonym Anna Span, British pornographic film director and politician
 Arthur Arrowsmith (1880–1954), English footballer who played for Stoke City
 Alex Arrowsmith (born 1982), rock musician
 Barbara Arrowsmith Young (born 1951), author and learning disability advocate
 Cheryl Arrowsmith, Canadian structural biologist
 Clive Arrowsmith, English photographer
 Edmund Arrowsmith (1585–1628), Roman Catholic martyr and saint
 James Arrowsmith (1839–1913) was a British printer and publisher
 John Arrowsmith (scholar) (1602–1659), English theologian and Master of Trinity College, Cambridge
 John Arrowsmith (cartographer) (1780–1873), geographer and map publisher
 John C. Arrowsmith (1894-1985) Brigadier general, US Army
Mary Noel Arrowsmith (1890-1965), American worker in WWI, won Croix de Guerre
 Pat Arrowsmith (born 1930), British author and peace campaigner
 Percy and Florence Arrowsmith, a British couple erroneously included in the Guinness Book of Records
 Robert Arrowsmith (born 1952), English cricketer
 Sue Arrowsmith (1950–2014), English artist
 Tony Arrowsmith (1887–?), English footballer who played for Grimsby Town
William Arrowsmith (1924–1992), American classicist, academic and translator

See also
 Fletcher (surname)

Occupational surnames
English-language occupational surnames